Cornubia can be:
Cornubia, the ancient Latin name for either:
Cornouaille, a historic region in Brittany, northwestern France
Cornwall, a region in southwestern England
Cornubia, a geologists' name for the Cornubian batholith, the granite massif of Devon and Cornwall in England
Cornubia, Queensland, a southern suburb of Brisbane, Queensland, Australia
 Cornubia City, a new development in Durban, South Africa
SS Cornubia (ship)
Cornubia (mite), a genus of mites